Charles Hamilton (13 November 1704 – 18 September 1786), styled The Honourable from birth, was a British politician.

He was a younger son of James Hamilton, 6th Earl of Abercorn. Hamilton matriculated at Christ Church, Oxford on 4 November 1720. He received his BA in 1723.

Hamilton represented Strabane in the Irish House of Commons between 1727 and 1760. He sat also for Truro in the British House of Commons from 1741 to 1747. He was elected a Fellow of the Royal Society in Mar 1747.

Hamilton's first wife, whose name seems to be unknown, died young, leaving two daughters, Jane and Sarah. He later married Agnes Cockburn of Ayr, Scotland in 1764. She died in 1772, aged 39.

He was the creator of Painshill Park

Hamilton was forced to sell Painshill in 1773 as he was being pressed to repay loans to Henry Fox and Henry Hoare. Hamilton retired to Bath, living in  a house in the Royal Crescent. He later purchased land on Lansdown Hill where he built a house, which still stands today, and a much admired garden.

He died at his house on Lansdown Hill, Bath on 18 September 1786.

References

1704 births
1786 deaths
Alumni of Christ Church, Oxford
British MPs 1741–1747
Irish MPs 1727–1760
Members of the Parliament of Ireland (pre-1801) for County Tyrone constituencies
Younger sons of earls
Members of the Parliament of Great Britain for Truro
Fellows of the Royal Society